Professor Axel Westman (29 December 1894 – 29 May 1960) was a Swedish physician and one of the foremost specialists in obstetrics and gynaecology of the twentieth century.

In 1927, he was appointed lectureship in obstetrics and gynaecology at the Karolinska Institute in Stockholm. He went on to hold lectureship posts at Lund University and Uppsala University.

He was nominated for the Nobel Prize in Physiology or Medicine in 1951.

References 

1894 births
1960 deaths
Westman family
Swedish obstetricians
Swedish gynaecologists
Academic staff of the Karolinska Institute
Academic staff of Uppsala University
Academic staff of Lund University